Rockaways' Playland was an amusement park that operated from 1902 to 1987 in Rockaway Beach in Queens, New York City.  Bounded by Beach 97th and Beach 98th Streets between Rockaway Beach Boulevard and the Rockaway Beach and Boardwalk, Rockaways' Playland was created in 1902 by roller coaster designer LaMarcus Adna Thompson. By 1903 a ferry dock was added not far from the park, making it more convenient to reach (from just about everywhere in New York City) than some of the competing amusement parks. The park was sold in 1927 to Robert Katlin who added amenities such as a gym and swimming pool, and the following year to A. Joseph Geist who achieved greater success than the previous owners. Between 1928 and 1970, Rockaways' Playland was extremely successful, drawing 175 million visitors. It closed in 1987 due to a sharp increase in the price of insurance.

History

Thompson's Amusement Park 
The park site was originally developed as a resort area in 1876 by William Wainwright. George Tilyou, owner of Steeplechase Park in Coney Island, Brooklyn, purchased land in the Seaside neighborhood along Rockaway Beach in 1900, naming the new land "Steeplechase Park". Simultaneously, roller coaster designer LaMarcus Adna Thompson had been slated to exhibit his Switchback Railway at the 1901 Pan-American Exposition, but nearly went bankrupt after he was unable to go to the exposition following the assassination of William McKinley. Tilyou offered  of property to Thompson, and the latter bought the property by 1901. Thompson's park is variously said to have opened in 1901, 1902, or 1903. It originally extended to the Rockaway Beach and Boardwalk. At the time, the land was known simply as Thompson's Amusement Park.

By 1905, Thompson was operating the amusement park by himself. Thompson's amusement park was one of several amusement destinations on the Rockaway Beach and Boardwalk at its heyday. A ferry dock adjacent to Thompson's park, added in 1903, enabled visitors from other boroughs to visit one of the several amusement districts along the beach. Upon Thompson's death in 1919, his family kept operating the park for eight years before selling it to a syndicate led by Robert Katlin in December 1927. Katlin then opened several facilities and amusements including a new arena, gymnasium, and swimming pool.

Geist operation 
In January 1928, the park was purchased by A. Joseph Geist, a Queens lawyer and businessman who would go on to serve as the president of the Rockaways Chamber of Commerce and on the Board of Higher Education. Renaming it Rockaways' Playland, Geist soon launched an expansion project that added a dance hall, menagerie, and roller coaster. He added numerous attractions in the early 1930s, and by 1936, he was advertising that the park contained 24 distinct attractions. New York City parks commissioner Robert Moses shut the amusement area in 1937, as he intended to build the Shore Front Parkway through the area. Moses had also destroyed the nearby bungalows in an unsuccessful attempt to shut down Playland. Following a rebuilding program costing between $3 million and $5 million, Geist reopened Playland in 1939.

Playland saw attendance decrease during World War II. A wartime blackout was applied to the area, which mandated that the park's lights be shut off to avoid enemy detection; the blackout was lifted in August 1945. More attractions, including a kiddie park named Joytown, were added in 1949, followed by the installation of new lighting systems the following year under a $1 million modernization program. Visitors continued to arrive from various places in the New York metropolitan area such as Jersey City, Lower Manhattan, and Yonkers. Boats to Sheepshead Bay, Brooklyn would start operating in 1954, followed by another ferry service to Westchester in 1964.

Throughout the 1950s, Playland hosted numerous events and special occasions. One New York Times article in 1953 described how six hundred orphans were taken to Playland. When Geist died in 1960, his son Richard took over the park and added numerous contests, such as beauty pageants every Monday evening and children's contests each Saturday afternoon. Playland saw a small attendance decrease during the 1964 New York World's Fair, hosted in nearby Flushing Meadows–Corona Park, though attendance quickly returned to normal levels after the fair. By 1970, Playland had attracted 175 million visitors in the years since A. Joseph Geist had purchased the park. Attendance began to decline in the late 1970s as the rides became more dated.The 1985 season was the last operating season for Playland, though at the time, Richard Geist did not intend for the park to close permanently. The following year, insurance premiums increased eightfold, from $50,000 in 1985 to $408,000 in 1986. At that time, Geist decided not to reopen the park. Upon Playland's closure, a housing development was planned on Playland's site. The land was still vacant by 1995, but had been developed by 2003. Today, the Beach 98th Street station of the New York City Subway still bears the name "Playland".

 Attractions 
At its opening, Thompson's Amusement Park included a steeplechase-style ride, where patrons would race along a track on horse-shaped vehicles, as well as a  bathhouse on the boardwalk. The park also included a midway with a funhouse, Skee-Ball ramp, and shooting gallery when it opened. The first roller coaster in the park was added in 1924 and was called the Gravity Wonder. A "tent city" with cabanas was located on the northern part of Thompson's Amusement Park.

In 1928, a  Olympic-size swimming pool was added to Playland, being used for Summer Olympic tryouts. An 8,000-seat arena was also added; before being torn down in 1930, it was used for circuses, as well as for church services on Sundays and for boxing matches on Fridays. A dance hall, gymnasium, and menagerie, were also added, and a 5,500-locker bathhouse was built.

In 1930 Geist added a Noah's Ark style attraction, with a setting resembling Mount Ararat, on the arena's site. The ark was a walk-through exhibit that featured "the sounds of rain, thunder, and Noah giving orders". Other additions in the early 1930s included flat rides such as the Rig-a-Jig, Leaping Lena, Cave O'Laffs, and the Pretzel. A wooden roller coaster called the Atom Smasher was added in 1938.

 In popular culture 
The Atom Smasher was featured in the movie This Is Cinerama. The release of This is Cinerama and its popularity and positive reception brought thousands of visitors to Playland. Playland was also shown in the 1982 movie Sophie's Choice''.

References

Citations

Sources

External links
 Playland photos
 1980 aerial view of Playland
 

Defunct amusement parks in New York (state)
Parks in Queens, New York
Rockaway, Queens